NIRMANA NEWS is an Indian television news channel. It is a part of the wider Gujarati, a subsidiary of the NIRMANA NEWS.
Nirman news is not available on tatasky

See also
List of Indian television stations

References

External links
 official website

Television stations in Ahmedabad
Television channels and stations established in 2014
Gujarati-language television channels in India